İnandıktepe is an archaeological site located in Cankiri Province, Turkey, about 50 miles northeast of Ankara and 115 kilometers northwest of Hattusa. In 1965 workers found there potsherds of the famous İnandık-vase. Thereafter excavations took place.

Excavations 

The site was excavated in 1966 and 1967 by Tahsin Özgüz. Overall five levels could be identified. Levels V, IV and III date to the 2nd millennium BC. Most of them dating to the Hittite Age. A complex of about 2000 sq. m. was unearthed extending over the entire ridge of the mound. It was preserved only in parts since it was destroyed in a great fire. The excavators supposed this building to be a temple. Nevertheless, this is controversial - it has also been suggested to be an estate.

Most of the archaeological finds were ceramics. Among them there were small vessels, jugs, a figurine of a bull, a temple-model as well as a tub. In addition there was found a clay tablet with an Akkadian inscription. It documents a land-gift of the official Tutulla. It is sealed by the Tabarna seal. 

The 'Tabarna seal' was a type of an archaic royal seal of the Hittites. Such seals do not mention the name of a specific ruler. They were in use till the reigns of the Great Kings Telipinu and Alluwamna, his successor. Hence it can be assumed that this tablet and the layer it was found in date to the late 16th century BC.

See also

Cities of the Ancient Near East
Hittites

Notes

Bibliography
 
 
 Özgüz T., "İnandiktepe. An Important Cult Center in the Old Hittite Period.", Ankara, 1988
 Mielke (2006). İnandıktepe un Sarissa. In: Mielke, Schoop, Seher (ed): Strukturierung und Datierung in der hethitischen Archäologie. Istanbul, pp. 251–276.

Anatolia
Former populated places in Turkey
Hittite cities
Hittite sites in Turkey
Early Ceramics in Anatolia